Rafael González Reséndiz (born 26 March 1979) is a Mexican politician affiliated with the PRI. He currently serves as Deputy of the LXII Legislature of the Mexican Congress representing Jalisco.

References

1979 births
Living people
People from Puerto Vallarta
Institutional Revolutionary Party politicians
21st-century Mexican politicians
Deputies of the LXII Legislature of Mexico
Members of the Chamber of Deputies (Mexico) for Jalisco